Lo imperdonable may refer to:

Lo imperdonable (1963 TV series)
Lo imperdonable (1975 TV series), original telenovela of Caridad Bravo Adams and Fernanda Villeli
Lo imperdonable (2015 TV series), telenovela based on La Mentira and produced by Salvador Mejía